On Civility in Children is a  handbook written by Erasmus of Rotterdam, and is considered to be the first treatise in Western Europe on the moral and practical education of children. First published in 1530 it was addressed to the eleven-year-old Henry of Burgundy, son of Adolph, Prince of Veere, and gives instructions, in simple Latin, on how a boy  should conduct himself in the company of adults. The  book achieved immediate success and was translated into many languages. The first English version, by Robert Whittinton (or Whittington) was published in 1532, under the title of A Little Book of Good Manners for Children. Another translation by Thomas Paynell was issued in 1560.

The book is divided into seventeen sections, each dealing with an aspect of behaviour.

Norbert Elias refers to this book in his most influential work, The Civilizing Process, claiming that Erasmus' specific use of the French term "civilité" reshaped its meaning, laying the groundwork for the later emergence of the influence of the word civilization for the French and British states.

References

Etiquette
Handbooks and manuals
1530 books
16th-century Latin books